Munier Choudhury (27 November 192514 December 1971) was a Bangladeshi educationist, playwright, literary critic and political dissident. He was a victim of the mass killing of Bangladeshi intellectuals in 1971. He was awarded Independence Day Award in 1980, by the then president Ziaur Rahman's government, posthumously.

Early life and education

Choudhury's ancestors were originated from Noakhali. He was born on 27 November 1925 in Manikganj. His father was Khan Bahadur Abdul Halim Chowdhury, a district magistrate and Aligarh Muslim University graduate. His mother was Umme Kabir Afia Begum (d. 2000). Because of his father's official assignment, Choudhury lived in Manikganj, Pirojpur and other parts of East Bengal. The family moved to Dhaka permanently in 1936. Then he grew up in the residence Darul Afia, named after her mother, among 14 siblings. He completed his matriculation from Dhaka Collegiate School in 1941 and intermediate examination from Aligarh Muslim University. He then studied English literature for his bachelor's degree (with honours) in 1946 and master's in 1947 at the University of Dhaka. He was expelled from Salimullah Hall, his residential dorm, because of his involvement in leftist politics. He was imprisoned for two years in 1952 for his participation in the Bengali Language Movement. While in jail, in 1954, he appeared at the master's examination in Bengali literature and stood first in the first class. Later, in 1958, he obtained his third master's degree in linguistics from Harvard University.

Academic career
In 1947, Choudhury started his career in teaching at Brajalal College in Khulna. He moved to Jagannath College in Dhaka in 1950. He joined the University of Dhaka in 1950 and taught both in the departments of English and Bengali until 1971. He became reader in 1962 and professor in 1970 and the dean of the faculty of arts in 1971.

Political activity
Choudhury was associated with leftist politics and progressive cultural movements. In 1948, he attended the Communist Party Conference in Kolkata. He was elected Secretary of the "Pragati Lekhak O Shilpi Sangha" (Progressive Writers and Artists Association). In 1952, he was arrested under the Preventive Detention Act for protesting against police repression and the killing of students on the Language Movement. In 1967, he protested the Pakistan government's ban on Tagore songs on radio and television. In the early 1950s, there was a movement in Pakistan to replace the Bengali language alphabet with the Arabic alphabet. As a linguist and writer, Choudhury protested this move to undermine the native language of East Pakistan. He actively participated in the non-co-operation movement during the early part of 1971 and renounced his award Sitara-e-Imtiaz, awarded by the Government of Pakistan in 1966.

Literary works
During his imprisonment in 1952–54, he wrote his symbolic drama on the historic language movement, Kabar (The Grave). He continued to write after being freed from prison, some of his notable works being Roktakto Prantor (1959; a play about the Third Battle of Panipat), Chithi (1966) and Polashi Barrack O Onyanno (1969). In 1965, Choudhury redesigned the keyboard of the Bangla typewriter, named Munier Optima Keyboard in collaboration with Remington typewriters of the then East Germany.

 Mir-Manas, 1965 – literary critique of Mir Mosharraf Hossain's literature
 Ektala-Dotala (first ever Bengali drama telecast on television), 1965
 Dandakaranya, 1966
 Tulanamulak Samalochana (Comparative critique), 1969
 Bangla Gadyariti (Bengali literary style), 1970

Awards
 Bangla Academy Literary Award (1962)
 Daud Prize (1965)
 Sitara-i-Imtiaz (denounced, 1966)
 Independence Day Award (posthumously, 1980)
 Bangladesh Mujibnagar Staff Welfare Association Commemoration (posthumously, 1992)
 Language Activist and Political Prisoner Council Commemoration (posthumously, 1993) 
 Liberation War Teachers' Council Commemoration (posthumously, 1996)
 Dhaka University Alumni Association Commemoration (posthumously, 2018) 
 Dhaka Metropolitan Police Commemoration (posthumously, 2019)

Death
After the Pakistani army crackdown in 1971 in the University of Dhaka area from which Chowdhury escaped like many, he moved to his parents' house, near Hatirpool. On 14 December 1971, he, along with a large number of Bengali intellectuals, educators, doctors and engineers, were kidnapped from their houses and later tortured and executed by the Pakistan Army and its Bengali collaborators Al-Badr and Al-Shams. According to a witness, Choudhury was last seen in Physical Training College in Mohammadpur Thana, Dhaka where his fingers were mutilated. His dead body could not be identified.

On 18 July 2013, Asif Munier Chowdhury Tonmoy, a son of Choudhury, made the statement before the International Crimes Tribunal-2. According to his testimony, Chowdhury Mueen-Uddin, a Muslim leader based in London, and Ashrafuz Zaman Khan, based in the United States, were directly involved in abduction, forced disappearance and killing of Choudhury. On 3 November the same year, both of them were sentenced in absentia after the court found that they were involved in the abduction and murders of 18 people – nine Dhaka University teachers including Choudhury, six journalists and three physicians – in December 1971.

Personal life

Choudhury was married to Lily Choudhury. Together they had three sons, Ahmed Munier, Ashfaque Munier (Mishuk) and Asif Munier. Ashfaq was a cinematographer. Ahmed is retired and previously worked for UN missions in Africa. Asif is a human rights activist and works in the development sector. He was a founder member of Projonmo Ekattor, a human rights group.

Choudhury's notable siblings include actress Ferdousi Mazumder, National Professor Kabir Chowdhury (d. 2011), columnist Shamsher Choudhury (d. 2012), language activist Nadera Begum (d. 2013) and the first Bengali Cadet to be awarded Sowrd of Honour at Pakistan Military Academy, Lt. Colonel Abdul Qayyum (d. 2013).

Legacy
Since 1989, a Bangladeshi theater troupe named Theatre has been conferring theater personalities for their contribution to the performing art form with Munier Chowdhury Shammanona award. Bangla Academy confers Shaheed Munier Choudhury Memorial Award to book publishing houses for the merit of quality of printing and aesthetic values. Central Road, the street in Dhaka where Choudhury lived, was renamed to Shaheed Munier Chowdhury Road. In 1991, on the 20th anniversary of Bangladesh's independence, the government issued a commemorative stamp featuring Choudhury.

On November 27, 2020, Google celebrated his 95th birthday with a Google Doodle.

References

1925 births
1971 deaths
People from Manikganj District
Bangladeshi dramatists and playwrights
Bangladeshi male novelists
20th-century novelists
20th-century dramatists and playwrights
University of Dhaka alumni
Aligarh Muslim University alumni
Harvard Graduate School of Arts and Sciences alumni
Academic staff of the University of Dhaka
People killed in the Bangladesh Liberation War
Pakistani torture victims
People murdered in Bangladesh
Recipients of the Independence Day Award
Recipients of Bangla Academy Award
Recipients of Sitara-i-Imtiaz
20th-century male writers
Bangladeshi textbook writers
People from Chatkhil Upazila
Dhaka Collegiate School alumni